The 1992–93 Belarusian Cup was the second season of the annual Belarusian football cup competition. It began on 24 September 1992 with the preliminary round and ended on 22 June 1993 with the final at the Dinamo Stadium in Minsk.

FC Dinamo Minsk were the defending champions, having defeated FC Dnepr Mogilev in the 1992 final, but were knocked out in the semifinals by FC Neman Grodno, eventual winners.

FC Neman Grodno won the final against FC Vedrich Rechitsa to win their first title.

Preliminary round
The games were played on 24 and 30 September 1992.

|}

Round of 32
The games were played on 7 October 1992.

|}

Round of 16
The games were played on 14 October 1992.

|}

Quarterfinals 
The first legs were played on 21 October 1992 and the second legs were played on 5 November 1992.

|}

Semifinals 
The first legs were played on 24 April 1993 and the second legs were played on 2 May 1993.

|}

Final
The final match was played on 22 June 1993 at the Dinamo Stadium in Minsk.

External links
 RSSSF

Belarusian Cup seasons
Belarusian Cup
Cup
Cup